Plastics are a wide range of synthetic or semi-synthetic materials that use polymers as a main ingredient. Their plasticity makes it possible for plastics to be moulded, extruded or pressed into solid objects of various shapes. This adaptability, plus a wide range of other properties, such as being lightweight, durable, flexible, and inexpensive to produce, has led to its widespread use. Plastics typically are made through human industrial systems. Most modern plastics are derived from fossil fuel-based chemicals like natural gas or petroleum; however, recent industrial methods use variants made from renewable materials, such as corn or cotton derivatives.

9.2 billion tonnes of plastic are estimated to have been made between 1950 and 2017. More than half this plastic has been produced since 2004. In 2020, 400 million tonnes of plastic were produced. If global trends on plastic demand continue, it is estimated that by 2050 annual global plastic production will reach over 1,100 million tonnes.

The success and dominance of plastics starting in the early 20th century has caused widespread environmental problems, due to their slow decomposition rate in natural ecosystems. Most plastic produced has not been reused, either being captured in landfills or persisting in the environment as plastic pollution. Plastic pollution can be found in all the world's major water bodies, for example, creating garbage patches in all of the world's oceans and contaminating terrestrial ecosystems. Of all the plastic discarded so far, some 14% has been incinerated and less than 10% has been recycled.

In developed economies, about a third of plastic is used in packaging and roughly the same in buildings in applications such as piping, plumbing or vinyl siding. Other uses include automobiles (up to 20% plastic), furniture, and toys. In the developing world, the applications of plastic may differ; 42% of India's consumption is used in packaging. In the medical field, polymer implants and other medical devices are derived at least partially from plastic. Worldwide, about 50 kg of plastic is produced annually per person, with production doubling every ten years.

The world's first fully synthetic plastic was Bakelite, invented in New York in 1907, by Leo Baekeland, who coined the term "plastics". Dozens of different types of plastics are produced today, such as polyethylene, which is widely used in product packaging, and polyvinyl chloride (PVC), used in construction and pipes because of its strength and durability. Many chemists have contributed to the materials science of plastics, including Nobel laureate Hermann Staudinger, who has been called "the father of polymer chemistry" and Herman Mark, known as "the father of polymer physics".

Etymology
The word plastic derives from the Greek πλαστικός (plastikos) meaning "capable of being shaped or molded," and in turn from πλαστός (plastos) meaning "molded." As a noun the word most commonly refers to the solid products of petrochemical-derived manufacturing.

The noun plasticity refers specifically here to the deformability of the materials used in the manufacture of plastics. Plasticity allows molding, extrusion or compression into a variety of shapes: films, fibers, plates, tubes, bottles and boxes, among many others. Plasticity also has a technical definition in materials science outside the scope of this article referring to the non-reversible change in form of solid substances.

Structure 
Most plastics contain organic polymers. The vast majority of these polymers are formed from chains of carbon atoms, with or without the attachment of oxygen, nitrogen or sulfur atoms. These chains comprise many repeating units formed from monomers. Each polymer chain consists of several thousand repeating units. The backbone is the part of the chain that is on the main path, linking together a large number of repeat units. To customize the properties of a plastic, different molecular groups called side chains hang from this backbone; they are usually hung from the monomers before the monomers themselves are linked together to form the polymer chain. The structure of these side chains influences the properties of the polymer.

Properties and classifications
Plastics are usually classified by the chemical structure of the polymer's backbone and side chains. Important groups classified in this way include the acrylics, polyesters, silicones, polyurethanes, and halogenated plastics. Plastics can be classified by the chemical process used in their synthesis, such as condensation, polyaddition, and cross-linking. They can also be classified by their physical properties, including hardness, density, tensile strength, thermal resistance, and glass transition temperature. Plastics can additionally be classified by their resistance and reactions to various substances and processes, such as exposure to organic solvents, oxidation, and ionizing radiation. Other classifications of plastics are based on qualities relevant to manufacturing or product design for a particular purpose. Examples include thermoplastics, thermosets, conductive polymers, biodegradable plastics, engineering plastics and elastomers.

Thermoplastics and thermosetting polymers

One important classification of plastics is the degree to which the chemical processes used to make them are reversible or not.

Thermoplastics do not undergo chemical change in their composition when heated and thus can be molded repeatedly. Examples include polyethylene (PE), polypropylene (PP), polystyrene (PS), and polyvinyl chloride (PVC).

Thermosets, or thermosetting polymers, can melt and take shape only once: after they have solidified, they stay solid. If reheated, thermosets decompose rather than melt. In the thermosetting process, an irreversible chemical reaction occurs. The vulcanization of rubber is an example of this process. Before heating in the presence of sulfur, natural rubber (polyisoprene) is a sticky, slightly runny material; after vulcanization, the product is dry and rigid.

Amorphous plastics and crystalline plastics
Many plastics are completely amorphous (without a highly ordered molecular structure), including thermosets, polystyrene, and methyl methacrylate (PMMA). Crystalline plastics exhibit a pattern of more regularly spaced atoms, such as high-density polyethylene (HDPE), polybutylene terephthalate (PBT), and polyether ether ketone (PEEK). However, some plastics are partially amorphous and partially crystalline in molecular structure, giving them both a melting point and one or more glass transitions (the temperature above which the extent of localized molecular flexibility is substantially increased). These so-called semi-crystalline plastics include polyethylene, polypropylene, polyvinyl chloride, polyamides (nylons), polyesters and some polyurethanes.

Conductive polymers

Intrinsically Conducting Polymers (ICP) are organic polymers that conduct electricity. While a conductivity of up to 80 kS/cm in stretch-oriented polyacetylene, has been achieved, it does not approach that of most metals. For example, copper has a conductivity of several hundred kS/cm.

Biodegradable plastics and bioplastics

Biodegradable plastics

Biodegradable plastics are plastics that degrade (break down) upon exposure to sunlight or ultra-violet radiation; water or dampness; bacteria; enzymes; or wind abrasion. Attack by insects, such as waxworms and mealworms, can also be considered as forms of biodegradation. Aerobic degradation requires that the plastic be exposed at the surface, whereas anaerobic degradation would be effective in landfill or composting systems. Some companies produce biodegradable additives to enhance biodegradation. Although starch powder can be added as a filler to allow some plastics to degrade more easily, such treatment does not lead to complete breakdown. Some researchers have genetically engineered bacteria to synthesize completely biodegradable plastics, such as polyhydroxy butyrate (PHB); however, these are relatively costly as of 2021.

Bioplastics

While most plastics are produced from petrochemicals, bioplastics are made substantially from renewable plant materials like cellulose and starch. Due both to the finite limits of fossil fuel reserves and to rising levels of greenhouse gases caused primarily by the burning of those fuels, the development of bioplastics is a growing field. Global production capacity for bio-based plastics is estimated at 327,000 tonnes per year. In contrast, global production of polyethylene (PE) and polypropylene (PP), the world's leading petrochemical-derived polyolefins, was estimated at over 150 million tonnes in 2015.

Plastic industry
The plastic industry includes the global production, compounding, conversion and sale of plastic products. Although the Middle East and Russia produce most of the required petrochemical raw materials; the production of plastic is concentrated in the global East and West. The plastic industry comprises a huge number of companies and can be divided into several sectors:

Production
9.2 billion tonnes of plastic are estimated to have been made between 1950 and 2017, with more than half this having been produced since 2004. Since the birth of the plastic industry in the 1950s, global production has increased enormously, reaching 400 million tonnes a year in 2021 up from 381 million metric tonnes in 2015 (excluding additives). From the 1950s rapid growth occurred in the use of plastics for packaging, in building and construction, and in other sectors. If global trends on plastic demand continue, it is estimated that by 2050 annual global plastic production will exceed 1.1 billion tonnes annually.

Plastics are produced in chemical plants by the polymerization of their starting materials (monomers); which are almost always petrochemical in nature. Such facilities are normally large and are visually similar to oil refineries, with sprawling pipework running throughout. The large size of these plants allows them to exploit economies of scale. Despite this, plastic production  is not particularly monopolized, with about 100 companies accounting for 90% of global production. This includes a mixture of private and state-owned enterprises. Roughly half of all production takes place in East Asia, with China being the largest single producer. Major international producers include:

Historically, Europe and North America have dominated global plastics production. However, since 2010 Asia has emerged as a significant producer, with China accounting for 31% of total plastic resin production in 2020. Regional differences in the volume of plastics production are driven by user demand, the price of fossil fuel feedstocks, and investments made in the petrochemical industry. For example, since 2010 over US$200 billion has been invested in the United States in new plastic and chemical plants, stimulated by the low cost of raw materials. In the European Union (EU), too, heavy investments have been made in the plastics industry, which employs over 1.6 million people with a turnover of more than 360 billion euros per year. In China in 2016 there were over 15,000 plastic manufacturing companies, generating more than US$366 billion in revenue.

In 2017 the global plastics market was dominated by thermoplastics– polymers that can be melted and recast. Thermoplastics include polyethylene (PE), polyethylene terephthalate (PET), polypropylene (PP), polyvinyl chloride (PVC), polystyrene (PS) and synthetic fibres, which together represent 86% of all plastics.

Compounding

Plastic is not sold as a pure unadulterated substance, but is instead mixed with various chemicals and other materials, which are collectively known as additives. These are added during the compounding stage and include substances such as stabilizers, plasticizers and dyes, which are intended to improve the lifespan, workability or appearance of the final item. In some cases, this can involve mixing different types of plastic together to form a polymer blend, such as high impact polystyrene. Large companies may do their own compounding prior to production, but some producers have it done by a third party. Companies that specialize in this work are known as Compounders.

The compounding of thermosetting plastic is relatively straightforward; as it remains liquid until it is cured into its final form. For thermosoftening materials, which are used to make the majority of products, it is necessary to melt the plastic in order to mix-in the additives. Molten plastic is viscous and exhibits laminar flow, leading to poor mixing. Compounding is therefore done using extrusion equipment, which is able to supply the necessary heat and mixing to give a properly dispersed product.

The concentrations of most additives are usually quite low, however high levels can be added to create Masterbatch products. The additives in these are concentrated but still properly dispersed in the host resin. Masterbatch granules can be mixed with cheaper bulk polymer and will release their additives during processing to give a homogeneous final product. This can be cheaper than working with a fully compounded material and is particularly common for the introduction of colour.

Converting

Companies that produce finished goods are known as converters (sometimes processors). The vast majority of plastics produced worldwide are thermosoftening and must be heated until molten in order to be molded. Various sorts of extrusion equipment exist which can then form the plastic into almost any shape.

Film blowing - Plastic films (carrier bags, sheeting)
Blow molding - Small thin-walled hollow objects in large quantities (drinks bottles, toys)
Rotational molding - Large thick-walled hollow objects (IBC tanks)
Injection molding - Solid objects (phone cases, keyboards) 
Spinning - Produces fibers (nylon, spandex etc.)

For thermosetting materials the process is slightly different, as the plastics are liquid to begin with and but must be cured to give solid products, but much of the equipment is broadly similar.

The most commonly produced plastic consumer products include packaging made from LDPE (e.g. bags, containers, food packaging film), containers made from HDPE (e.g. milk bottles, shampoo bottles, ice cream tubs), and PET (e.g. bottles for water and other drinks). Together these products account for around 36% of plastics use in the world. Most of them (e.g. disposable cups, plates, cutlery, takeaway containers, carrier bags) are used for only a short period, many for less than a day. The use of plastics in building and construction, textiles, transportation and electrical equipment also accounts for a substantial share of the plastics market. Plastic items used for such purposes generally have longer life spans. They may be in use for periods ranging from around five years (e.g. textiles and electrical equipment) to more than 20 years (e.g. construction materials, industrial machinery).

Plastic consumption differs among countries and communities, with some form of plastic having made its way into most people's lives. North America (i.e. the North American Free Trade Agreement or NAFTA region) accounts for 21% of global plastic consumption, closely followed by China (20%) and Western Europe (18%). In North America and Europe there is high per capita plastic consumption (94 kg and 85 kg/capita/year, respectively). In China there is lower per capita consumption (58 kg/capita/year), but high consumption nationally because of its large population.

Types of plastics

Commodity plastics

Around 70% of global production is concentrated in six major polymer types, the so-called commodity plastics. Unlike most other plastics these can often be identified by their resin identification code (RIC):
 Polyethylene terephthalate (PET or PETE)
 High-density polyethylene (HDPE or PE-HD)
 Polyvinyl chloride (PVC or V)
 Low-density polyethylene (LDPE or PE-LD),
 Polypropylene (PP)
 Polystyrene (PS)

Polyurethanes (PUR) and PP&A fibres are often also included as major commodity classes, although they usually lack RICs, as they are chemically quite diverse groups. These materials are inexpensive, versatile and easy to work with, making them the preferred choice for the mass production everyday objects. Their biggest single application is in packaging, with some 146 million tonnes being used this way in 2015, equivalent to 36% of global production. Due to their dominance; many of the properties and problems commonly associated with plastics, such as pollution stemming from their poor biodegradability, are ultimately attributable to commodity plastics.

A huge number of plastics exist beyond the commodity plastics, with many having exceptional properties.

Engineering plastics
Engineering plastics are more robust and are used to make  products such as vehicle parts, building and construction materials, and some machine parts. In some cases they are polymer blends formed by mixing different plastics together (ABS, HIPS etc.). Engineering plastics can replace metals in vehicles, lowering their weight and improving fuel efficiency by 6–8%. Roughly 50% of the volume of modern cars is made of plastic, but this only accounts for 12–17% of the vehicle weight.

Acrylonitrile butadiene styrene (ABS): electronic equipment cases (e.g. computer monitors, printers, keyboards) and drainage pipe
High impact polystyrene (HIPS): refrigerator liners, food packaging and vending cups
Polycarbonate (PC): compact discs, eyeglasses, riot shields, security windows, traffic lights, and lenses
Polycarbonate + acrylonitrile butadiene styrene (PC + ABS): a blend of PC and ABS that creates a stronger plastic used in car interior and exterior parts, and in mobile phone bodies
Polyethylene + acrylonitrile butadiene styrene (PE + ABS): a slippery blend of PE and ABS used in low-duty dry bearings
Polymethyl methacrylate (PMMA) (acrylic): contact lenses (of the original "hard" variety), glazing (best known in this form by its various trade names around the world; e.g. Perspex, Plexiglas, and Oroglas), fluorescent-light diffusers, and rear light covers for vehicles. It also forms the basis of artistic and commercial acrylic paints, when suspended in water with the use of other agents.
Silicones (polysiloxanes): heat-resistant resins used mainly as sealants but also used for high-temperature cooking utensils and as a base resin for industrial paints
Urea-formaldehyde (UF): one of the aminoplasts used as a multi-colorable alternative to phenolics: used as a wood adhesive (for plywood, chipboard, hardboard) and electrical switch housings

High-performance plastics
High-performance plastics are usually expensive, with their use limited to specialised applications which make use of their superior properties.

Aramids: best known for their use in making body armor, this class of heat-resistant and strong synthetic fibers are also used in aerospace and military applications, includes Kevlar and Nomex, and Twaron.
Ultra-high-molecular-weight polyethylenes
Polyetheretherketone (PEEK): strong, chemical- and heat-resistant thermoplastic; its biocompatibility allows for use in medical implant applications and aerospace moldings. It is one of the most expensive commercial polymers.
Polyetherimide (PEI) (Ultem): a high-temperature, chemically stable polymer that does not crystallize
Polyimide: a high-temperature plastic used in materials such as Kapton tape
Polysulfone: high-temperature melt-processable resin used in membranes, filtration media, water heater dip tubes and other high-temperature applications
Polytetrafluoroethylene (PTFE), or Teflon: heat-resistant, low-friction coatings used in non-stick surfaces for frying pans, plumber's tape and water slides
Polyamide-imide (PAI): High-performance engineering plastic extensively used in high performance gears, switches, transmission and other automotive components, and aerospace parts.

Gallery

Applications
The largest application for plastics is as packaging materials, but they are used in a wide range of other sectors, including: construction (pipes, gutters, door and windows), textiles (stretchable fabrics, fleece), consumer goods (toys, tableware, toothbrushes), transportation (headlights, bumpers, body panels, wing mirrors), electronics (phones, computers, televisions) and as machine parts.

Additives
Additives are chemicals blended into plastics to change their performance or appearance, making it possible to alter the properties of plastics to better suit their intended applications. Additives are therefore one of the reasons why plastic is used so widely. Plastics are composed of chains of polymers. Many different chemicals are used as plastic additives. A randomly chosen plastic product generally contains around 20 additives. The identities and concentrations of additives are generally not listed on products.

In the EU, over 400 additives are used in high volumes. 5500 additives were found in a global market analysis. At a minimum all plastic contains some polymer stabilisers which permit them to be melt-processed (moulded) without suffering polymer degradation. Other additives are optional and can be added as required, with loadings varying significantly between applications. The amount of additives contained in plastics varies depending on the additives’ function. For example, additives in polyvinyl chloride (PVC) can constitute up to 80% of the total volume. Pure unadulterated plastic (barefoot resin) is never sold, even by the primary producers.

Leaching 
Additives may be weakly bound to the polymers or react in the polymer matrix. Although additives are blended into plastic they remain chemically distinct from it, and can gradually leach back out during normal use, when in landfills, or following improper disposal in the environment. Additives may also degrade to form other toxic molecules. Plastic fragmentation into microplastics and nanoplastics can allow chemical additives to move in the environment far from the point of use. Once released, some additives and derivatives may persist in the environment and bioaccumulate in organisms. They can have adverse effects on human health and biota. A recent review by the United States Environmental Protection Agency (US EPA) revealed that out of 3,377 chemicals potentially associated with plastic packaging and 906 likely associated with it, 68 were ranked by ECHA as "highest for human health hazards" and 68 as "highest for environmental hazards".

Recycling 

As additives change the properties of plastics they have to be considered during recycling. Presently, almost all recycling is performed by simply remelting and reforming used plastic into new items. Additives present risks in recycled products, as they are difficult to remove. When plastic products are recycled, it is highly likely that the additives will be integrated into the new products. Waste plastic, even if it is all of the same polymer type, will contain varying types and amounts of additives. Mixing these together can give a material with inconsistent properties, which can be unappealing to industry. For example, mixing different coloured plastics with different plastic colorants together can produce a discoloured or brown material and for this reason plastic is usually sorted by both polymer type and color before recycling.

Absence of transparency and reporting across the value chain often results in lack of knowledge concerning the chemical profile of the final products. For example, products containing brominated flame retardants have been incorporated into new plastic products. Flame retardants are a group of chemicals used in electronic and electrical equipment, textiles, furniture and construction materials which should not be present in food packaging or child care products. A recent study found brominated dioxins as unintentional contaminants in toys made from recycled plastic electronic waste that contained brominated flame retardants. Brominated dioxins have been found to exhibit toxicity similar to that of chlorinated dioxins. They can have negative developmental effects and negative effects on the nervous system and interfere with mechanisms of the endocrine system.

Health effects 
Many of the controversies associated with plastics actually relate to their additives, as some compounds can be persistent, bioaccumulating and potentially harmful. The now banned flame retardants OctaBDE and PentaBDE are an example of this, while the health effects of phthalates are an ongoing area of public concern. Additives can also be problematic if waste is burned, especially when burning is uncontrolled or takes place in low- technology incinerators, as is common in many developing countries. Incomplete combustion can cause emissions of hazardous substances such as acid gases and ash which can contain persistent organic pollutants (POPs) such as dioxins.

A number of additives identified as hazardous to humans and/or the environment are regulated internationally. The Stockholm Convention on Persistent Organic Pollutants (POPs) is a global treaty to protect human health and the environment from chemicals that remain intact in the environment for long periods, become widely distributed geographically, accumulate in the fatty tissue of humans and wildlife, and have harmful impacts on human health or on the environment.

Other additives proven to be harmful such as cadmium, chromium, lead and mercury (regulated under the Minamata Convention on Mercury), which have previously been used in plastic production, are banned in many jurisdictions. However they are still routinely found in some plastic packaging including food packaging. The use of the additive bisphenol A (BPA) in plastic baby bottles is banned in many parts of the world, but is not restricted in some low-income countries.

In 2023, plasticosis, a new disease caused solely by plastics, was discovered in seabirds.
The birds identified as having the disease have scarred digestive tracts from ingesting plastic waste.  ”When birds ingest small pieces of plastic, they found, it inflames the digestive tract. Over time, the persistent inflammation causes tissues to become scarred and disfigured, affecting digestion, growth and survival.”

Types of additive

Toxicity
Pure plastics have low toxicity due to their insolubility in water, and because they have a large molecular weight, they are biochemically inert. Plastic products contain a variety of additives, however, some of which can be toxic. For example, plasticizers like adipates and phthalates are often added to brittle plastics like PVC to make them pliable enough for use in food packaging, toys, and many other items. Traces of these compounds can leach out of the product. Owing to concerns over the effects of such leachates, the EU has restricted the use of DEHP (di-2-ethylhexyl phthalate) and other phthalates in some applications, and the US has limited the use of DEHP, DPB, BBP, DINP, DIDP, and DnOP in children's toys and child-care articles through the Consumer Product Safety Improvement Act. Some compounds leaching from polystyrene food containers have been proposed to interfere with hormone functions and are suspected human carcinogens (cancer-causing substances). Other chemicals of potential concern include alkylphenols.

While a finished plastic may be non-toxic, the monomers used in the manufacture of its parent polymers may be toxic. In some cases, small amounts of those chemicals can remain trapped in the product unless suitable processing is employed. For example, the World Health Organization's International Agency for Research on Cancer (IARC) has recognized vinyl chloride, the precursor to PVC, as a human carcinogen.

Bisphenol A (BPA)

Some plastic products degrade to chemicals with estrogenic activity. The primary building block of polycarbonates, bisphenol A (BPA), is an estrogen-like endocrine disruptor that may leach into food. Research in Environmental Health Perspectives finds that BPA leached from the lining of tin cans, dental sealants and polycarbonate bottles can increase the body weight of lab animals' offspring. A more recent animal study suggests that even low-level exposure to BPA results in insulin resistance, which can lead to inflammation and heart disease. As of January 2010, the Los Angeles Times reported that the US Food and Drug Administration (FDA) is spending $30 million to investigate indications of BPA's link to cancer. Bis(2-ethylhexyl) adipate, present in plastic wrap based on PVC, is also of concern, as are the volatile organic compounds present in new car smell. The EU has a permanent ban on the use of phthalates in toys. In 2009, the US government banned certain types of phthalates commonly used in plastic.

Environmental effects

Because the chemical structure of most plastics renders them durable, they are resistant to many natural degradation processes. Much of this material may persist for centuries or longer, given the demonstrated persistence of structurally similar natural materials such as amber.

There are differing estimates of how much plastic waste has been produced in the last century. By one estimate, one billion tons of plastic waste have been discarded since the 1950s. Others estimate a cumulative human production of 8.3 billion tons of plastic, of which 6.3 billion tons is waste, with only 9% getting recycled.

It is estimated that this waste is made up of 81% polymer resin, 13% polymer fibres and 32% additives. In 2018 more than 343 million tonnes of plastic waste were generated, 90% of which was composed of post-consumer plastic waste (industrial, agricultural, commercial and municipal plastic waste). The rest was pre-consumer waste from resin production and manufacturing of plastic products (e.g. materials rejected due to unsuitable colour, hardness, or processing characteristics).

The Ocean Conservancy reported that China, Indonesia, Philippines, Thailand, and Vietnam dump more plastic into the sea than all other countries combined. The rivers Yangtze, Indus, Yellow, Hai, Nile, Ganges, Pearl, Amur, Niger, and Mekong "transport 88% to 95% of the global [plastics] load into the sea."

The presence of plastics, particularly microplastics, within the food chain is increasing. In the 1960s microplastics were observed in the guts of seabirds, and since then have been found in increasing concentrations. The long-term effects of plastics in the food chain are poorly understood. In 2009 it was estimated that 10% of modern waste was plastic, although estimates vary according to region. Meanwhile, 50% to 80% of debris in marine areas is plastic. Plastic is often used in agriculture. There is more plastic in the soil that in the oceans. The presence of plastic in the environment hurt ecosystems and human health.

Research on the environmental impacts has typically focused on the disposal phase. However, the production of plastics is also responsible for substantial environmental, health and socioeconomic impacts.

Prior to the Montreal Protocol, CFCs had been commonly used in the manufacture of the plastic polystyrene, the production of which had contributed to depletion of the ozone layer.

Efforts to minimize environmental impact of plastics may include lowering of plastics production and use, waste- and recycling-policies, and the proactive development and deployment of alternatives to plastics such as for sustainable packaging.

Microplastics

Decomposition of plastics

Plastics  degrade by a variety of processes, the most significant of which is usually photo-oxidation. Their chemical structure determines their fate. Polymers' marine degradation takes much longer as a result of the saline environment and cooling effect of the sea, contributing to the persistence of plastic debris in certain environments. Recent studies have shown, however, that plastics in the ocean decompose faster than had been previously thought, due to exposure to the sun, rain, and other environmental conditions, resulting in the release of toxic chemicals such as bisphenol A. However, due to the increased volume of plastics in the ocean, decomposition has slowed down. The Marine Conservancy has predicted the decomposition rates of several plastic products: It is estimated that a foam plastic cup will take 50 years, a plastic beverage holder will take 400 years, a disposable diaper will take 450 years, and fishing line will take 600 years to degrade.

Microbial species capable of degrading plastics are known to science, some of which are potentially useful for disposal of certain classes of plastic waste.
In 1975, a team of Japanese scientists studying ponds containing waste water from a nylon factory discovered a strain of Flavobacterium that digests certain byproducts of nylon 6 manufacture, such as the linear dimer of 6-aminohexanoate. Nylon 4 (polybutyrolactam) can be degraded by the ND-10 and ND-11 strands of Pseudomonas sp. found in sludge, resulting in GABA (γ-aminobutyric acid) as a byproduct.
Several species of soil fungi can consume polyurethane, including two species of the Ecuadorian fungus Pestalotiopsis. They can consume polyurethane both aerobically and anaerobically (such as at the bottom of landfills).
Methanogenic microbial consortia degrade styrene, using it as a carbon source. Pseudomonas putida can convert styrene oil into various biodegradable plastic|biodegradable polyhydroxyalkanoates.
Microbial communities isolated from soil samples mixed with starch have been shown to be capable of degrading polypropylene.
The fungus Aspergillus fumigatus effectively degrades plasticized PVC. Phanerochaete chrysosporium has been grown on PVC in a mineral salt agar.</ref> P. chrysosporium, Lentinus tigrinus, A. niger, and A. sydowii can also effectively degrade PVC.
Phenol-formaldehyde, commonly known as Bakelite, is degraded by the white rot fungus P. chrysosporium.
Acinetobacter has been found to partially degrade low-molecular-weight polyethylene oligomers. When used in combination, Pseudomonas fluorescens and Sphingomonas can degrade over 40% of the weight of plastic bags in less than three months. The thermophilic bacterium Brevibacillus borstelensis (strain 707) was isolated from a soil sample and found capable of using low-density polyethylene as a sole carbon source when incubated at 50 °C. Pre-exposure of the plastic to ultraviolet radiation broke chemical bonds and aided biodegradation; the longer the period of UV exposure, the greater the promotion of the degradation.
Hazardous molds have been found aboard space stations that degrade rubber into a digestible form.
Several species of yeasts, bacteria, algae and lichens have been found growing on synthetic polymer artifacts in museums and at archaeological sites.
In the plastic-polluted waters of the Sargasso Sea, bacteria have been found that consume various types of plastic; however, it is unknown to what extent these bacteria effectively clean up poisons rather than simply release them into the marine microbial ecosystem.
Plastic-eating microbes also have been found in landfills.
Nocardia can degrade PET with an esterase enzyme.
The fungus Geotrichum candidum, found in Belize, has been found to consume the polycarbonate plastic found in CDs.
Futuro houses are made of fiberglass-reinforced polyesters, polyester-polyurethane, and PMMA. One such house was found to be harmfully degraded by Cyanobacteria and Archaea.

Recycling

Pyrolysis 
By heating to above 500 °C in the absence of oxygen (pyrolysis), plastics can be broken down into simpler hydrocarbons. These can be reused as starting materials for new plastics. They can also be used as fuels.

Climate change 
According to the OECD, plastic contributed greenhouse gases in the equivalent of 1.8 billion tons of carbon dioxide to the atmosphere in 2019, 3.4% of global emissions. They say that by 2060, plastic could emit 4.3 billion tons of greenhouse gas emissions a year.

The effect of plastics on global warming is mixed. Plastics are generally made from petroleum, thus the production of plastics creates further emissions. However, due to the lightness and durability of plastic versus glass or metal, plastic may lower energy consumption. For example, packaging beverages in PET plastic rather than glass or metal is estimated to save 52% in transportation energy.

Production of plastics
Production of plastics from crude oil requires 7.9 to 13.7 kWh/lb (taking into account the average efficiency of US utility stations of 35%). Producing silicon and semiconductors for modern electronic equipment is even more energy consuming: 29.2 to 29.8 kWh/lb for silicon, and about 381 kWh/lb for semiconductors. This is much higher than the energy needed to produce many other materials. For example, to produce iron (from iron ore) requires 2.5-3.2 kWh/lb of energy; glass (from sand, etc.) 2.3–4.4 kWh/lb; steel (from iron) 2.5–6.4 kWh/lb; and paper (from timber) 3.2–6.4 kWh/lb.

Incineration of plastics
Quickly burning plastics at very high temperatures breaks down many toxic components, such as dioxins and furans. This approach is widely used in municipal solid waste incineration. Municipal solid waste incinerators also normally treat the flue gas to decrease pollutants further, which is needed because uncontrolled incineration of plastic produces carcinogenic polychlorinated dibenzo-p-dioxins. Open-air burning of plastic occurs at lower temperatures and normally releases such toxic fumes.

In the European Union, municipal waste incineration is regulated by the Industrial Emissions Directive, which stipulates a minimum temperature of 850 °C for at least two seconds.

History

The development of plastics has evolved from the use of naturally plastic materials (e.g., gums and shellac) to the use of the chemical modification of those materials (e.g., natural rubber, cellulose, collagen, and milk proteins), and finally to completely synthetic plastics (e.g., bakelite, epoxy, and PVC). Early plastics were bio-derived materials such as egg and blood proteins, which are organic polymers. In around 1600 BC, Mesoamericans used natural rubber for balls, bands, and figurines. Treated cattle horns were used as windows for lanterns in the Middle Ages. Materials that mimicked the properties of horns were developed by treating milk proteins with lye. In the nineteenth century, as chemistry developed during the Industrial Revolution, many materials were reported. The development of plastics accelerated with Charles Goodyear's 1839 discovery of vulcanization to harden natural rubber.

Parkesine, invented by Alexander Parkes in 1855 and patented the following year, is considered the first man-made plastic. It was manufactured from cellulose (the major component of plant cell walls) treated with nitric acid as a solvent. The output of the process (commonly known as cellulose nitrate or pyroxilin) could be dissolved in alcohol and hardened into a transparent and elastic material that could be molded when heated. By incorporating pigments into the product, it could be made to resemble ivory. Parkesine was unveiled at the 1862 International Exhibition in London and garnered for Parkes the bronze medal.

In 1893, French chemist Auguste Trillat discovered the means to insolubilize casein (milk proteins) by immersion in formaldehyde, producing material marketed as galalith. In 1897, mass-printing press owner Wilhelm Krische of Hanover, Germany, was commissioned to develop an alternative to blackboards. The resultant horn-like plastic made from casein was developed in cooperation with the Austrian chemist (Friedrich) Adolph Spitteler (1846–1940). Although unsuitable for the intended purpose, other uses would be discovered.

The world's first fully synthetic plastic was Bakelite, invented in New York in 1907 by Leo Baekeland, who coined the term plastics. Many chemists have contributed to the materials science of plastics, including Nobel laureate Hermann Staudinger, who has been called "the father of polymer chemistry," and Herman Mark, known as "the father of polymer physics."

After World War I, improvements in chemistry led to an explosion of new forms of plastics, with mass production beginning in the 1940s and 1950s. Among the earliest examples in the wave of new polymers were polystyrene (first produced by BASF in the 1930s) and polyvinyl chloride (first created in 1872 but commercially produced in the late 1920s). In 1923, Durite Plastics, Inc., was the first manufacturer of phenol-furfural resins. In 1933, polyethylene was discovered by Imperial Chemical Industries (ICI) researchers Reginald Gibson and Eric Fawcett.

The discovery of polyethylene terephthalate is credited to employees of the Calico Printers' Association in the UK in 1941; it was licensed to DuPont for the US and ICI otherwise, and as one of the few plastics appropriate as a replacement for glass in many circumstances, resulting in widespread use for bottles in Europe. In 1954 polypropylene was discovered by Giulio Natta and began to be manufactured in 1957. Also in 1954 expanded polystyrene (used for building insulation, packaging, and cups) was invented by Dow Chemical.

Policy 

Work is currently underway to develop a global treaty on plastic pollution. On March 2, 2022 UN Member States voted at the resumed fifth UN Environment Assembly (UNEA-5.2) to establish an Intergovernmental Negotiating Committee (INC) with the mandate of advancing a legally-binding international agreement on plastics. The resolution is entitled “End plastic pollution: Towards an international legally binding instrument.” The mandate specifies that the INC must begin its work by the end of 2022 with the goal of "completing a draft global legally binding agreement by the end of 2024."

See also 

 Biodegradable plastic
 Bioplastic
 Corn construction
 Films
 Light activated resin
 Microplastics (nurdles)
 Molding (process)
 Injection molding
 Rotational molding
 Organic light emitting diode
 Organisms breaking down plastic
 Plastic film
 Plastic pollution
 Plastic recycling
 Plastics engineering
 Plastics extrusion
 Plasticulture
 Progressive bag alliance
 Refill (scheme)
 Roll-to-roll processing
 Self-healing plastic
 Thermal cleaning
 Thermoforming
 Timeline of materials technology
 Plastic pollution

References 

 Substantial parts of this text originated from An Introduction to Plastics v1.0 by Greg Goebel (1 March 2001), which is in the public domain.

Sources

External links 

 
 
 
 
 
 

 
Dielectrics